Galium lanceolatum (lanceleaf wild licorice) is a species of plant in the Rubiaceae.

Galium lanceolatum is native to Canada (Quebec and Ontario) plus parts of the United States, primarily New England,  the Great Lakes region and the Appalachian Mountains as far south as northeastern Alabama and northwestern South Carolina.

References

External links
United States Department of AgriculturePlants Profile
Go Botany, New England Wildflower Society
Illinois Wildflowers

lanceolatum
Flora of North America
Plants described in 1819